I Did It may refer to:

 "I Did It" (Dave Matthews Band song), 2001
 "I Did It" (Spica song), 2014
 "I Did It" (DJ Khaled song), 2021
 I Did It (film), a 1909 short film
 "I Did It", a 1970 song by Barbara Acklin, written by Eugene Record
 "I Did It", a 1970 song by The Dynamites, written by Clancy Eccles
If I Did It, a 2007 novel by O. J. Simpson and Pablo Fenjves (sometimes stylized where "if" is not easily visible on the cover)